The 1998 Worthing Borough Council election took place on 7 May 1998 to elect members of  Worthing Borough Council in West Sussex, England. One third of the council was up for election and the Liberal Democrat party kept overall control of the council.

After the election, the composition of the council was:
Liberal Democrat 21
Conservative 15

Election result

References

1998 English local elections
1998
1990s in West Sussex